Love is a studio album by Rosemary Clooney, arranged by Nelson Riddle, recorded in 1961 but not released until 1963.

Clooney and Riddle were having an affair at the time of the recording, and this was the second album that Riddle had arranged for Clooney. They recorded Rosie Solves the Swingin' Riddle! in 1960 for RCA Victor Records, and the songs that make up Love were recorded the same year. RCA Victor didn't release Love at the time, and Frank Sinatra bought the master tapes for Love  from RCA when he signed Clooney to his record label, Reprise Records in 1963.

Reviewing the CD reissue of the album in 1995, New York Times music critic Stephen Holden compared Love to Riddle's legendary 1955 collaboration with Frank Sinatra, In the Wee Small Hours. "Ms. Clooney was 32 when she recorded the album," Holden wrote, "and her singing is hushed and lovely."

Track listing
 "Invitation" (Bronisław Kaper, Paul Francis Webster) – 2:50
 "I Wish It So" (Marc Blitzstein) – 4:09
 "Yours Sincerely" (Lorenz Hart, Richard Rodgers) – 3:25
 "Imagination" (Johnny Burke, Jimmy Van Heusen) – 4:04
 "Find the Way" (Ian Bernard) – 3:49
 "How Will I Remember You" (Walter Lloyd Gross, Carl Sigman) – 4:20
 "Why Shouldn't I?" (Cole Porter) – 3:23
 "More Than You Know" (Edward Eliscu, Billy Rose, Vincent Youmans) – 3:20
 "You Started Something" (Floyd Huddleston, Al Rinker) – 2:32
 "It Never Entered My Mind" (Hart, Rodgers) – 4:38
 "If I Forget You" (Irving Caesar) – 4:31
 "Someone to Watch Over Me" (George Gershwin, Ira Gershwin) – 3:37

Personnel

Performance
 Rosemary Clooney – vocal
 Nelson Riddle – arranger, conductor

References

1963 albums
Rosemary Clooney albums
Albums arranged by Nelson Riddle
Reprise Records albums
Albums conducted by Nelson Riddle